Volutomitra is a genus of sea snails, marine gastropod molluscs in the family Volutomitridae, the mitres, with global distribution.

Species
Species in the genus Volutomitra include:
 † Volutomitra amplexa (Finlay, 1930) †
 Volutomitra andreiae R. Salisbury & Gori, 2019
 Volutomitra bairdii (Dall, 1889)
 Volutomitra banksi (Dell, 1951) 
 Volutomitra bayeri Okutani, 1982
 Volutomitra blanfordi (Melvill & Standen, 1901)
 Volutomitra carlosbranai R. Salisbury & Gori, 2019
 Volutomitra erebus Bayer, 1971 - Erebus mitre-volute
 Volutomitra filippoi R. Salisbury & Gori, 2019
 Volutomitra francescae R. Salisbury & Gori, 2019
 Volutomitra geoffreyana (Melvill, 1910)
 Volutomitra glabella Bouchet & Kantor, 2000
 Volutomitra groenlandica (Moller, 1842) - false Greenland mitre
 Volutomitra hottentota Thiele, 1925
 † Volutomitra incisa (Marwick, 1942) 
 † Volutomitra inconspicua (Hutton, 1885) 
 † Volutomitra lornensis (Marwick, 1926) 
 Volutomitra obscura (Hutton, 1873)
 † Volutomitra othoniana (Finlay, 1924) 
 Volutomitra pailoloana (J. Cate, 1963)
 Volutomitra persephone Bayer, 1971
 Volutomitra rosadoi R. Salisbury & Gori, 2019
 Volutomitra tenella Golikov & Sirenko, 1998
 † Volutomitra transilis (Finlay, 1930) 
 Volutomitra vaubani Cernohorsky, 1982
 Volutomitra ziczac Bouchet & Kantor, 2004
Species brought into synonymy 
 Volutomitra alaskana Dall, 1902 : synonym of Volutomitra groenlandica (Beck in Möller, 1842)
 Volutomitra porcellana (Melvill & Standen, 1912): synonym of Volvarina porcellana (Melvill & Standen, 1912)

References

 Bouchet P. & Kantor Y. 2004. New Caledonia: the major centre of biodiversity for volutomitrid molluscs (Mollusca: Neogastropoda: Volutomitridae). Systematics and Biodiversity 1(4): 467-502
 Powell A. W. B., New Zealand Mollusca, William Collins Publishers Ltd, Auckland, New Zealand 1979 
 

Volutomitridae
Extant Late Cretaceous first appearances